Jean Stern may refer to:

 Jean Stern (fencer) (1875–1962), French épée fencer
 Jean Stern (art historian) (born 1946), art historian and museum director